Chestnut Mountain is a mountain near the city of Brevard, North Carolina.  It reaches an elevation of 3,012 feet (918 m).  The mountain generates feeder streams for the French Broad River.

References

Mountains of North Carolina
Mountains of Transylvania County, North Carolina